The J.M. Aylor House, at 2162 Petersburg Rd. in Hebron, Kentucky is a historic house listed on the National Register of Historic Places in 1989. The listing included two contributing buildings and a contributing structure.

The house is a double-pile central passage plan house.  The property includes a hexagonal gazebo with a hipped roof, and a one-room caretaker's/servant's house with a gabled roof and bargeboard ornamentation.

References

National Register of Historic Places in Boone County, Kentucky
Central-passage houses
Houses on the National Register of Historic Places in Kentucky
Houses in Boone County, Kentucky
Gothic Revival architecture in Kentucky